Lucas Glendening (born April 28, 1989) is an American professional ice hockey player for the Dallas Stars of the National Hockey League (NHL). He previously played in the NHL for the Detroit Red Wings.

Playing career

Amateur
Glendening started out his years of playing hockey in his hometown East Grand Rapids, Michigan. He played varsity all four years he attended East Grand Rapids High School and was their leading scorer for two out of the four years. He also spent one year as a post-graduate at The Hotchkiss School. Prior to turning professional, Glendening attended the University of Michigan where he played four seasons (2008—2012) of NCAA college hockey with the Michigan Wolverines.

In his sophormore season, Glendening was an alternate captain for Michigan. In 45 games, Glendening recorded seven goals and 14 assists. The Wolverines slipped to seventh in the CCHA but won six straight games in the conference tournament to win the 2010 CCHA men's ice hockey tournament and earn an NCAA tournament bid. Michigan defeated Bemidji State in the NCAA Midwest Regional before falling to Miami, 3–2, in double overtime in the regional final.

Glendening was a captain for Michigan in his junior season, along with Carl Hagelin. He was one of six Wolverines to play in all 44 games, where he recorded eight goals and 10 assists. Michigan finished first in the CCHA and received an at-large bid to the NCAA tournament after a surprise loss to Western Michigan in the CCHA semifinals. The Wolverines swept Nebraska-Omaha and Colorado College to capture the NCAA West Regional and defeated North Dakota, 2–0, to reach the Frozen Four championship game; falling 3–2 to Minnesota-Duluth in overtime.

Glendening was again a captain for Michigan in his senior season and scored a career-high 10 goals and 11 assists in 41 games. The Wolverines finished tied for second place in the CCHA with Western Michigan and received an at-large bid to the NCAA tournament after falling to the Broncos in the CCHA Championship Game. Cornell defeated Michigan, 3–2 in overtime, in the regional semifinals.

Professional
On June 19, 2012, the Grand Rapids Griffins of the American Hockey League (AHL) signed Glendening as a free agent to a one-year contract. During the 2012–13 AHL season season, Glendening played 51 regular-season games in the AHL with the Griffins, and also played 27 games in the ECHL with the Toledo Walleye, where he was selected to play in the 2013 ECHL All-Star Game, but could not attend because he was recalled to the AHL. Glendening played 24 post-season games with Grand Rapids, scoring 16 points to help lead the Griffins to their first Calder Cup championship.
	 
On July 5, 2013, the Detroit Red Wings signed Glendening to a one-year, two-way contract. On October 12, 2013, Glendening made his NHL debut in a game against the Philadelphia Flyers. On April 5, 2014, the Detroit Red Wings signed Glendening to a three-year contract extension. Glendening scored his first career NHL goal later that night against Carey Price of the Montreal Canadiens. Glendening set a franchise record among rookie forwards for the most games played without a goal, at 52 games, surpassing Cummy Burton, who played his entire 43-game Detroit career without scoring a goal.

On July 14, 2016, the Red Wings signed Glendening to a four-year contract extension. On March 10, 2020, Glendening played in his 500th career NHL game for the Red Wings, becoming the first undrafted player to do so for Detroit since the NHL went to a seven-round draft in 2005.

Following his eighth season with the Red Wings, having concluded his contract Glendening left the organization as a free agent and was signed by the Dallas Stars to a two-year, $3 million contract on July 28, 2021.

International play
On April 19, 2019, Glendening was selected to make his international debut in representing Team USA at the 2019 IIHF World Championship, held in Bratislava and Košice, Slovakia.

Career statistics

Regular season and playoffs

International

References

External links

 

1989 births
Living people
American men's ice hockey centers
Dallas Stars players
Detroit Red Wings players
Grand Rapids Griffins players
Ice hockey players from Michigan
Hotchkiss School alumni
Michigan Wolverines men's ice hockey players
Providence Bruins players
Sportspeople from Grand Rapids, Michigan
Toledo Walleye players
Undrafted National Hockey League players